Christine Warren is a USA Today and The New York Times recognized American author of romance novels. She is the author of the series The Others. Her books are published by St. Martin’s Press.

Biography
Christine Warren was born and raised in coastal New England. She currently lives in the Pacific Northwest where she enjoys horseback riding, playing with her pets, identifying dogs from photos of their underbellies, and reading things someone else had written, when she herself is not working on a novel.

Bibliography

The Others

Novel
Wolf At The Door (2006)
She's No Faerie Princess (2006)
The Demon You Know (2007)
Howl at the Moon (2007)
Walk on the Wild Side (2008)
One Bite With A Stranger (2008)
Big Bad Wolf (2009)
You're So Vein (2009)
Born To Be Wild (2010)
Prince Charming Doesn't Live Here (2010)
Black Magic Woman (2011)
Not Your Ordinary Faerie Tale (2011)
On the Prowl (2012)
Drive Me Wild (2012)
Hungry Like A Wolf (2013)

Short Stories
Fantasy Fix (2003) (expanded and retitled One Bite With A Stranger)
Fur Factor (2003) (expanded and retitled Big Bad Wolf)
Faer Fetched (2003) (expanded and retitled Prince Charming Doesn't Live Here)
Fighting Faer (2003) (expanded and retitled Not Your Ordinary Faerie Tale)
Fur For All (2003) (expanded and retitled Drive Me Wild)
Fur Play (2004) (expanded and retitled Hungry Like A Wolf)

Gargoyles Series
Heart of Stone (2013)
Stone Cold Lover (2014)
Hard as a Rock (2015) 
Rocked by Love (2016)
Hard to Handle (2017)
Hard Breaker (2017)

Online Short Stories
The Bargaining (2005) at Amazon
Heart of the Sea (2009) at Macmillan Part of the Others series

Anthologies
Any Witch Way She Can in No Rest for the Witches (2007) with MaryJanice Davidson, Lori Handeland, and Cheyenne McCray. Part of the Others series
Devil’s Bargain in Huntress (2009) with Marjorie M. Liu, Caitlin Kittredge, and Jenna Maclaine.

References

External links
official website
Macmillan Page
Fantastic Fiction page

Living people
21st-century American novelists
American romantic fiction writers
American women novelists
Year of birth missing (living people)
21st-century American women writers
21st-century American short story writers